Morro Bay (Morro, Spanish for "Hill") is a seaside city in San Luis Obispo County, California. Located on the Central Coast of California, the city population was 10,757 as of the 2020 census, up from 10,234 at the 2010 census. The town overlooks Morro Bay, a natural embayment with an all-weather small craft commercial and recreational harbor.

History 

The prehistory of Morro Bay relates to Chumash settlement, particularly near the mouth of Morro Creek. At least as early as the Millingstone Horizon thousands of years before present, there was an extensive settlement along the banks and terraces above Morro Creek. A tribal site on present-day Morro Bay was named tsɨtqawɨ, Obispeño for "Place of the Dogs".

The first European land exploration of Alta California, the Spanish Portolá expedition, came down Los Osos Valley and camped near today's Morro Bay on September 8, 1769. Franciscan missionary and expedition member Juan Crespí noted in his diary that "we saw a great rock in the form of a round morro".

The first recorded Filipinos to visit America arrived at Morro Bay on October 18, 1587, from the Spanish galleon Nuestra Señora de la Esperanza; one of whom was killed by local Native Americans while scouting ahead.

While governed by Mexico, large land grants split the surrounding area into cattle and dairy ranchos. These ranchos needed shipping to bring in dry goods and to carry their crops, animals, and other farm products to cities.

The town of Morro Bay was founded by Franklin Riley in 1870 as a port for the export of dairy and ranch products. He was instrumental in the building of a wharf which has now become the Embarcadero. During the 1870s, schooners could often be seen at the Embarcadero picking up wool, potatoes, barley, and dairy products.

A subspecies of butterfly, the "Morro Bay Blue" or " Morro Blue" (Icaricia icarioides moroensis) was first found at Morro beach, by the entomologist Robert F. Sternitzky, in June 1929.

During World War II, there was a U.S. Navy base, Amphibious Training Base Morro Bay on the north side of Morro Rock where sailors were trained to operate LCVPs. The breakwater on the southwest side of the Rock was built in 1944–45 to protect the LCVPs entering and leaving the harbor. Soldiers from Camp San Luis Obispo would come to Morro Bay and practice loading into the LCVPs. Many of those men were at Normandy on D-Day.

In the 1940s, Morro Bay developed an abalone fishing industry; it peaked in 1957, and stocks of abalone have declined significantly due to overfishing. Halibut, sole, rockfish, albacore, and many other species are still caught by both commercial and sport vessels. In addition, oysters are aquacultured in the shallow back bay.

The Pacific Gas and Electric Company built the Morro Bay Power Plant in the early 1950s which created jobs and increased the tax base. The city incorporated in 1964.

Geography

Morro Bay is the name of the large estuary that is situated along the northern shores of the bay itself. The larger bay on which the local area lies is Estero Bay, which also encompasses the communities of Cayucos and Los Osos. Los Osos Creek discharges into Morro Bay.

Morro Rock
The descriptive term morro is common to the Spanish, Portuguese, and Italian languages, and the word is part of many place names where there is a distinctive and prominent hill-shaped rock formation. Originally, it was surrounded by water, but the northern channel was filled in to make the harbor. It was quarried from 1889 to 1969, and in 1968, it was designated a Historical Landmark.

The area around the base of Morro Rock is open to visitors, with parking lots and paths. Climbing the rock is prohibited due to risk of injury, and because it is a peregrine falcon reserve.

Morro Rock is one in a series of similar plugs that stretch in a line inland called the Nine Sisters.

Morro Bay Harbor

Morro Bay is a natural embayment with an artificial harbor constructed by the U.S. Army Corps of Engineers. It is the only all-weather small craft commercial and recreational harbor between Santa Barbara and Monterey. Morro Rock was originally surrounded by water, but the Army built a large artificial breakwater and road across the north end of the harbor, linking Morro Rock and the mainland. Some of the rock used for this and for the artificial breakwaters was quarried from Morro Rock itself. Other rock was imported by barge from Catalina Island. Morro Bay is recognized for protection by the California Bays and Estuaries Policy.

There is usually a small summer colony of otters in the kelp near the harbor entrance.

Climate
Morro Bay experiences a mild warm-summer Mediterranean climate (Köppen Csb) characteristic of coastal California featuring dry, warm summers and wet, mild winters. The city is located next to the Pacific Ocean, which helps moderate temperatures and create an overall pleasant mild year-round climate, resulting in warmer winters and cooler summers compared with places farther inland, such as Atascadero.

Demographics

2010

The 2010 United States Census reported that Morro Bay had a population of 10,234. The racial makeup of Morro Bay was 8,909 (87.1%) White, 44 (0.4%) African American, 92 (0.9%) Native American, 258 (2.5%) Asian, 9 (0.1%) Pacific Islander, 613 (6.0%) from other races, and 309 (3.0%) from two or more races. Hispanic or Latino of any race were 1,526 persons (14.9%).

The Census reported that 10,073 people (98.4% of the population) lived in households, 36 (0.4%) lived in non-institutionalized group quarters, and 125 (1.2%) were institutionalized.

There were 4,844 households, out of which 919 (19.0%) had children under the age of 18 living in them, 1,972 (40.7%) were opposite-sex married couples living together, 405 (8.4%) had a female householder with no husband present, 217 (4.5%) had a male householder with no wife present. There were 330 (6.8%) unmarried opposite-sex partnerships, and 35 (0.7%) same-sex married couples or partnerships. 1,808 households (37.3%) were made up of individuals, and 783 (16.2%) had someone living alone who was 65 years of age or older. The average household size was 2.08. There were 2,594 families (53.6% of all households); the average family size was 2.70.

The population was spread out, with 1,530 people (15.0%) under the age of 18, 815 people (8.0%) aged 18 to 24, 2,264 people (22.1%) aged 25 to 44, 3,200 people (31.3%) aged 45 to 64, and 2,425 people (23.7%) who were 65 years of age or older. The median age was 48.9 years. For every 100 females, there were 95.8 males. For every 100 females age 18 and over, there were 93.6 males.

The homeowner vacancy rate was 3.3%; the rental vacancy rate was 6.3%. 5,218 people (51.0% of the population) lived in owner-occupied housing units and 4,855 people (47.4%) lived in rental housing units.

2000

As of the 2000 census, there were 10,350 people, 4,986 households, and 2,612 families residing in Morro Bay. The racial makeup of the city was 89.44% White, 0.68% African American, 0.95% Native American, 1.81% Asian, 0.09% Pacific Islander, 4.10% from other races, and 2.95% from two or more races. Hispanic or Latino of any race were 11.43% of the population.

There were 4,986 households, out of which 16.7% had children under the age of 18 living with them, 40.5% were married couples living together, 8.3% had a female householder with no husband present, and 47.6% were non-families. Of all households 38.0% were made up of individuals, and 16.4% had someone living alone who was 65 years of age or older. The average household size was 2.04 and the average family size was 2.65.

In the city, the population was spread out, with 15.1% under the age of 18, 8.4% from 18 to 24, 25.4% from 25 to 44, 26.8% from 45 to 64, and 24.2% who were 65 years of age or older. The median age was 46 years. For every 100 females, there were 91.3 males. For every 100 females age 18 and over, there were 89.8 males.

The median income for a household in the city was $34,379, and the median income for a family was $43,508. Males had a median income of $31,073 versus $25,576 for females. The per capita income for the city was $21,687. About 8.1% of families and 13.0% of the population were below the poverty line, including 16.9% of those under age 18 and 5.8% of those age 65 or over.

Morro Bay High School and Del Mar Elementary offer education for grades K−5 and 9−12.

Economy

Tourism is the city's largest industry, coexisting with the town's commercial fishery. A number of tourist attractions are found along the shoreline and the streets closest to it, especially the Embarcadero, including restaurants, shops and parks.

The most popular beach is on the north side of Morro Rock, north of the harbor. There are also excellent beaches north and south of the town which are owned by the State of California.

Power plant

The power plant has played a large role in Morro Bay, and in providing electricity to the Central Coast and the Central Valley of California (primarily Fresno and Bakersfield). The plant was built in the 1950s. The plant was staffed with 44 employees. A portion of the city's budget came from taxes on the natural gas the plant burned. Previously owned by Pacific Gas and Electric Co.(PG&E), Duke Energy, and LSPower (PG&E), Dynegy had hoped to modernize it with a new combined cycle plant. The plant was operating at relatively low capacity factors (approximately 5%) under contract with PG&E, due primarily to economics.

The modernization proposal was rejected, and the plant closed in February 2014. Continued operation would have required expensive upgrades by 2015. The 650-megawatt plant operated around the clock during the energy crisis of 2000, but the plant had been operating at just one-sixth of that capacity in the recent years preceding its closure.

In 2021, the city council of Morro Bay voted 4-1 to take down the power plant's smoke stacks by 2028. The city estimated that maintaining the smoke stacks would cost around a million dollars per year. Vistra Corp agreed to tear down the stacks and plans to build a  lithium-ion battery installation.

Government

Notable people
James Horvath, children's author and illustrator
Jack LaLanne, American fitness, exercise, nutritional expert and motivational speaker
Jerome Long, NFL defensive lineman
Kent Nagano, conductor and opera administrator, grew up in Morro Bay and graduated from Morro Bay High School
Mel Queen, professional baseball player, coach, scout and executive
Gladys Walton, silent film actress

In popular culture
Morro Bay served as the primary setting for Pixar's 2016 film Finding Dory, in which it was revealed that Dory's childhood home was the Marine Life Institute, known as "The Jewel of Morro Bay, California".
Murder by Numbers was filmed on the Morro Bay Embarcadero, as well as in Los Osos and San Luis Obispo.
The track scenes in Personal Best (film) were filmed at Morro Bay High School, with other filming throughout San Luis Obispo County.
Morro Bay is an album by indie pop band Brazzaville, released in 2013. It also included a self-titled song.
Morro Bay is mentioned with other Californian sights and locations in the Beach Boys song "California Saga: California", released 1973 on the album Holland.
Morro Bay provides the setting for episode five, season four of television drama series The Affair (2018).
Morro Bay is the location of the fictional Night City in the Cyberpunk role-playing game franchise, including the CD Projekt Red video game Cyberpunk 2077. There is a fictional version of the town called Paleto Bay in 2013's Grand Theft Auto V By Rockstar Games

References

External links

Information about Morro Bay
Morro Bay Guide to Nature, Recreation, Politics, Culture

 
Beaches of Southern California
Cities in San Luis Obispo County, California
Incorporated cities and towns in California
Populated coastal places in California
Populated places established in 1870
Ports and harbors of California
1870 establishments in California